The 2019–20 Taça da Liga was the thirteenth edition of the Taça da Liga (also known as Allianz Cup for sponsorship reasons), a football league cup competition organised by the Liga Portuguesa de Futebol Profissional and contested exclusively by clubs competing in the top two professional tiers of Portuguese football – the Primeira Liga and the LigaPro. It began on 27 July 2019 and concluded with the final in Braga on 25 January 2020, between Braga and Porto.

Sporting CP, who had won the previous two titles, were eliminated by Braga in the semi-finals. In a rematch of the 2013 final, Braga defeated Porto 1–0 to earn its second title. Porto lost their fourth consecutive league cup final, after appearances in the 2010, 2013, and 2019 finals.

Format
Ten teams placed 4th–15th in the 2018–19 LigaPro (reserve teams from Primeira Liga clubs are excluded) and the two teams promoted to the 2019–20 LigaPro take part in the first round; one-legged ties with no extra-time were played between twelve teams.

In the second round, the six teams advancing from the previous round are joined by the fourteen teams placed 5th–18th in the 2018–19 Primeira Liga, by the three teams promoted to 2019–20 Primeira Liga and the team placed 3rd in the 2018–19 LigaPro. Again, one-legged ties with no extra-time were played between twenty-four teams.

The third round features the twelve teams advancing from the previous round and the four best-placed teams in the 2018–19 Primeira Liga. The sixteen teams were drawn into four groups that are contested in a single round-robin schedule, with each team playing at least one game at home.

The four group winners qualify for the knockout phase, which features single-legged ties, again with no extra-time being played. The semi-finals and final are played at a neutral venue, set to be in Braga until 2020.

Tiebreakers
In the third round, teams are ranked according to points (3 points for a win, 1 point for a draw, 0 points for a loss). If two or more teams are tied on points on completion of the group matches, the following criteria are applied to determine the rankings:
highest goal difference in all group matches;
highest number of scored goals in all group matches;
lowest average age of all players fielded in all group matches (sum of the ages of all fielded players divided by the number of fielded players).

In all other rounds, teams tied at the end of regular time contest a penalty shootout to determine the winner. No extra-time is played.

Teams
Thirty-four teams competing in the two professional tiers of Portuguese football for the 2019–20 season are eligible to participate in this competition. For teams that were either promoted or related, the final position in the previous league season determines in which round they enter the competition.

Key
Nth: League position in the 2018–19 season
P1: Promoted to the Primeira Liga
P2: Promoted to the LigaPro
R1: Relegated to the LigaPro

Schedule

First round
The twelve non-reserve teams competing in the 2019–20 LigaPro entered the competition in this round. Twelve teams were paired against each other for six single-legged ties. The draw took place on 5 July 2019, and the matches were played on 27 and 28 July 2019. Games tied at the end of regular time were decided by a penalty shootout with no extra-time being played. The first team drawn in each fixture played at home.

Notes:

Second round
In the second round, the six first-round winners joined the fourteen teams ranked 5th–18th in the 2018–19 Primeira Liga, the team ranked 3rd in the 2018–19 LigaPro and the three teams promoted to the 2018–19 Primeira Liga. Twenty-four teams were paired against each other for twelve single-legged ties. The draw took place on 5 July 2019, and the matches were played on 3 and 5 August 2019. Games tied at the end of regular time were decided by a penalty shootout with no extra-time being played. The first team drawn in each fixture played at home.

Notes:

Third round
In the third round, the twelve second-round winners joined the four top-ranked teams from the 2018–19 Primeira Liga: Benfica (1st), Porto (2nd), Sporting CP (3rd) and Braga (4th). These sixteen teams were drawn into four groups of four, each group containing one of the four top-ranked Primeira Liga teams. Group matches were be played in a single round-robin schedule, ensuring that each team played at least one match at home.

For the draw, the teams were seeded into four pots based on their league position in the previous season, with the teams participating in the 2018–19 Primeira Liga being seeded higher regardless of any relegation. The draw took place on 3 September 2019, and the matches were played between 25 September and 21 December 2019. The fixtures and match dates were decided by an additional draw.

Group A

Group B

Group C

Group D

Knockout phase
The knockout phase was contested as a final-four tournament by the four third-round group winners in one-legged semi-finals and final. All matches were played in a single venue, decided before the competition starts. As in the first and second round, games tied at the end of regular time were decided by a penalty shootout with no extra-time being played.

The first semi-final was played between the winners of Groups A (Braga) and C (Sporting CP), while the second between Group B (Vitória de Guimarães) and D (Porto) winners. Groups A and B winners (Braga and Vitória de Guimarães, respectively) were designated as the "home" teams (for administrative purposes) in their semi-final clashes as was the winner of the first semi-final in the final. If the team that played at home in the appointed neutral stadium was still in competition, in this case Braga, they would be designated the home team regardless of which group or semi-final they played.

All matches were played at Estádio Municipal de Braga, in Braga, with the semi-finals played on 21 and 22 January, and the final on 25 January 2020.

Semi-finals

Final

References

External links
 Liga Portugal official website

Taça da Liga
Taca da Liga
Portugal